Carry Falls Reservoir is a man-made lake on the Raquette River, located southeast of Stark, New York. Fish species present in the reservoir are smallmouth bass, northern pike, yellow perch, black bullhead, tiger muskellunge, rock bass, and walleye. There is a state owned hard ramp boat launch located on the southwest shore.

References 

Reservoirs in St. Lawrence County, New York